The 1927–28 NHL season was the 11th season of the National Hockey League. Ten teams played 44 games each. The New York Rangers won the Stanley Cup beating the Montreal Maroons, becoming the first NHL team based in the United States to win it.

League business

The O'Brien Cup, which used to go to the National Hockey Association (NHA), later the NHL league champion, would now go to the winner of the Canadian Division. The Prince of Wales Trophy, first awarded to the winner of the first game at Madison Square Garden, and later the NHL league champion, would now go to the winner of the American division.

The first indications that the Ottawa Senators were in financial trouble surfaced when they asked the league for a bigger share of road game income. Though the league entertained the Senators suggestion, the Senators did not receive this income. It was decided by the Ottawa management to sell star right wing Hooley Smith to the Montreal Maroons for an undisclosed amount of money ($22,500 it was believed). At the same time, right wing Punch Broadbent returned to Ottawa.

The Toronto Maple Leafs introduce new sweaters of blue and white, changing from the former green logo on white uniform. They are the first team in the NHL to have a set of white uniforms and a set of dark uniforms.

Rule changes
The league changed the rule for substitution, allowing "on the fly" changes, as long as the player going off is on the bench before the substitute goes on.

Regular season
The Chicago Black Hawks fired coach Pete Muldoon before the season, and coaching was split between Hugh Lehman and Barney Stanley. The Black Hawks finished last, recording only seven wins. The firing of Muldoon prompted him to publicly put "a curse" (known as the "curse of the Muldoons") on the Black Hawks, stating that the team would never win the NHL pennant. The Black Hawks would not place first in the NHL until the 1966–67 season.

The Ottawa Senators, the smallest market in the league, were affected by franchises in the U.S. and sold their star right wing Hooley Smith to the Montreal Maroons for $22,500 plus the return of right wing Punch Broadbent, followed by the sale of defenceman Edwin Gorman to Toronto.

Howie Morenz, the NHL's top drawing card, dominated the scoring race and was runaway winner of the Hart Trophy. He scored 33 goals and led the league in assists as well. Despite Ottawa's financial difficulties, Alex Connell, Ottawa goalkeeper, set an all-time record with six consecutive shutouts. His record shutout sequence reached 460 minutes and 59 seconds without being scored on.

Toronto, now the Maple Leafs, showed power early on and it looked like they would make the playoffs. However, injuries to Hap Day and Bill Carson doomed the team, and the Leafs sagged to fourth, out of the playoffs for the third straight year. It would take another 80 years until the Leafs missed the playoffs three straight times again.

Thanks to the great play of Eddie Shore and goaltender Hal Winkler, who tied with Connell for the leader in shutouts with 15, the Boston Bruins finished first for the first time in the American Division, while the Canadiens, who were running away with the Canadian Division at mid-season, slumped after an injury to Pit Lepine but managed to hold onto first place at season's end.

Final standings

Note: W = Wins, L = Losses, T = Ties, Pts = Points, GF= Goals For, GA = Goals Against, PIM = Penalties in minutes

Note: Teams that qualified for the playoffs are highlighted in bold

Playoffs
In the Canadian Division, the Montreal Maroons beat the Ottawa Senators and then went to the limit against the Canadiens before Russell Oatman put the Maroons into the finals with a goal in overtime.

In the American Division, the New York Rangers knocked off the Pittsburgh Pirates in a rough series, and then beat Boston to go to the finals against the Montreal Maroons.

Playoff bracket

Quarterfinals

(A2) New York Rangers vs. (A3) Pittsburgh Pirates

(C2) Montreal Maroons vs. (C3) Ottawa Senators

Semifinals

(A1) Boston Bruins vs. (A2) New York Rangers

(C1) Montreal Canadiens vs. (C2) Montreal Maroons

Stanley Cup Finals

The circus knocked the Rangers out of Madison Square Garden, and all games were played in the Montreal Forum, even though Boston offered to host the Rangers. The Maroons won game one 2–0, with Nels Stewart and goaltender Clint Benedict the stars.

Drama took over in game two when Nels Stewart fired a hard shot that struck New York goaltender Lorne Chabot in the eye. He could not continue, and the Rangers needed a goaltender. However, when coach Eddie Gerard refused to let the Rangers use Alex Connell or minor league goaltender Hugh McCormick, Lester Patrick, Ranger coach, in anger, decided to don the pads himself. The Rangers then body-blasted any Maroon who got near Patrick. Bill Cook scored, putting the Rangers ahead 1–0, but Nels Stewart was not to be denied and scored, tying the game. In overtime, Frank Boucher got the winner for the Rangers and they carried Patrick, tears streaming down his eyes, off the ice. Patrick stopped 17 of 18 shots he faced.
 
Joe "Red Light" Miller, New York Americans goalie, was allowed to take Chabot's place in goal and he played well in a 2–0 loss in game three. However, Frank Boucher starred as the Rangers took the next two games, and the Stanley Cup. Drama almost took place in the final game when Miller was badly cut on a shot, but he was able to continue. The crowd became unruly at times and referee Mike Rodden took abuse for disallowed goals by Maroon players. Even NHL president Frank Calder was a target of some fans for not intervening. The Rangers became the second American team to win the Cup and the first NHL American team to do so. In addition, the Rangers became the first team to win the Stanley Cup at the Montreal Forum which was only repeated in 1989

Awards
The terms for awarding the O'Brien Cup and the Prince of Wales Trophy were changed to honour the top finisher in each of the NHL's divisions. Howie Morenz won the Hart Trophy, the first of three times he would be named most valuable player. Frank Boucher won the Lady Byng, the first of seven times he would win the award. George Hainsworth won the Vezina Trophy for the second consecutive year.

Player statistics

Scoring leaders
Note: GP = Games played; G = Goals; A = Assists; Pts = Points

Source: NHL

Leading goaltenders
Note: GP = Games played; Mins = Minutes played; GA = Goals against; SO = Shut outs; GAA = Goals against average

Source: hockey-reference.com

Coaches

American Division
Boston Bruins: Art Ross
Chicago Black Hawks: Barney Stanley and Hughie Lehman
Detroit Cougars: Jack Adams
New York Rangers: Lester Patrick
Pittsburgh Pirates: Odie Cleghorn

Canadian Division
Montreal Canadiens: Cecil Hart
Montreal Maroons: Eddie Gerard
New York Americans: Shorty Green
Ottawa Senators: Dave Gill
Toronto Maple Leafs: Conn Smythe

Debuts
The following is a list of players of note who played their first NHL game in 1927–28 (listed with their first team, asterisk(*) marks debut in playoffs):
Dit Clapper, Boston Bruins
Norman Gainor, Boston Bruins
Cy Wentworth, Chicago Black Hawks
Charlie Gardiner, Chicago Black Hawks
Larry Aurie, Detroit Cougars
Marty Burke, Montreal Canadiens
Jimmy Ward, Montreal Maroons
Joe Lamb, Montreal Maroons
Marty Barry, New York Americans
Allan Shields, Ottawa Senators
Joe Primeau, Toronto Maple Leafs

Last games
The following is a list of players of note that played their last game in the NHL in 1927–28 (listed with their last team):* Denotes last game was in the playoffs.
Sprague Cleghorn, Boston Bruins
Corb Denneny, Chicago Black Hawks
Frank Foyston, Detroit Cougars
Jack Walker, Detroit Cougars
Billy Boucher, New York Americans
Odie Cleghorn, Pittsburgh Pirates
Lester Patrick, New York Rangers*

See also
1927-28 NHL Transactions
List of Stanley Cup champions
Ice hockey at the 1928 Winter Olympics
Prairie Hockey League
List of pre-NHL seasons
1927 in sports
1928 in sports

References
 
 
 
 
 
 

Notes

External links
Hockey Database
NHL.com

 
NHL
NHL